Barbershop Canyon is a valley in Coconino County, Arizona, in the United States.

Barbershop Canyon received its name from the fact that sheep were sheared there.

References

Valleys of Arizona
Landforms of Coconino County, Arizona